DZGN (102.3 FM), broadcasting as 102.3 Spirit FM, is a radio station owned and operated by Good News Sorsogon Foundation, the media arm of the Roman Catholic Diocese of Sorsogon. Its studios & transmitter are located at the back of Sts. Peter & Paul Cathedral Compound, Rizal St., Sorsogon City.

It was a Top 40 station from its inception on November 22, 1984, until February 17, 2007, when it was relaunched as a mass-based station with a mix of music, religious & talk programming.

Notable personalities
DJ Augustino
DJ Marco
DJ Victoria

References

Catholic radio stations
Radio stations in Sorsogon
Radio stations established in 1984